Immunodeficiency, also known as immunocompromisation, is a state in which the immune system's ability to fight infectious diseases and cancer is compromised or entirely absent. Most cases are acquired ("secondary") due to extrinsic factors that affect the patient's immune system. Examples of these extrinsic factors include HIV infection and environmental factors, such as nutrition.
Immunocompromisation may also be due to genetic diseases/flaws such as SCID.

In clinical settings, immunosuppression by some drugs, such as steroids, can either be an adverse effect or the intended purpose of the treatment. Examples of such use is in organ transplant surgery as an anti-rejection measure and in patients with an overactive immune system, as in autoimmune diseases. Some people are born with intrinsic defects in their immune system, or primary immunodeficiency.

A person who has an immunodeficiency of any kind is said to be immunocompromised. An immunocompromised individual may particularly be vulnerable to opportunistic infections, in addition to normal infections that could affect anyone. It also decreases cancer immunosurveillance, in which the immune system scans the body's cells and kills neoplastic ones. They are also more susceptible to infectious diseases owing to reduced protection afforded by vaccines.

Types

By affected component
 Humoral immune deficiency (including B cell deficiency or dysfunction), with signs or symptoms depending on the cause, but generally include signs of hypogammaglobulinemia (decrease of one or more types of antibodies) with presentations including repeated mild respiratory infections, and/or agammaglobulinemia (lack of all or most antibody production) which results in frequent severe infections and is often fatal.
 T cell deficiency, often causes secondary disorders such as acquired immune deficiency syndrome (AIDS).
 Granulocyte deficiency, including decreased numbers of granulocytes (called as granulocytopenia or, if absent, agranulocytosis) such as of neutrophil granulocytes (termed neutropenia). Granulocyte deficiencies also include decreased function of individual granulocytes, such as in chronic granulomatous disease.
 Asplenia, where there is no function of the spleen
 Complement deficiency is where the function of the complement system is deficient

In reality, immunodeficiency often affects multiple components, with notable examples including severe combined immunodeficiency (which is primary) and acquired immune deficiency syndrome (which is secondary).

Primary or secondary
The distinction between primary versus secondary immunodeficiencies is based on, respectively, whether the cause originates in the immune system itself or is, in turn, due to insufficiency of a supporting component of it or an external decreasing factor of it.

Primary immunodeficiency

A number of rare diseases feature a heightened susceptibility to infections from childhood onward.  Primary Immunodeficiency is also known as congenital immunodeficiencies.  Many of these disorders are hereditary and are autosomal recessive or X-linked. There are over 95 recognised primary immunodeficiency syndromes; they are generally grouped by the part of the immune system that is malfunctioning, such as lymphocytes or granulocytes.

The treatment of primary immunodeficiencies depends on the nature of the defect, and may involve antibody infusions, long-term antibiotics and (in some cases) stem cell transplantation. The characteristics of lacking and/or impaired antibody functions can be related to illnesses such as X-Linked Agammaglobulinemia and Common Variable Immune Deficiency

Secondary immunodeficiencies

Secondary immunodeficiencies, also known as acquired immunodeficiencies, can result from various immunosuppressive agents, for example, malnutrition, aging, particular medications (e.g., chemotherapy, disease-modifying antirheumatic drugs, immunosuppressive drugs after organ transplants, glucocorticoids) and environmental toxins like mercury and other heavy metals, pesticides and petrochemicals like styrene, dichlorobenzene, xylene, and ethylphenol. For medications, the term immunosuppression generally refers to both beneficial and potential adverse effects of decreasing the function of the immune system, while the term immunodeficiency generally refers solely to the adverse effect of increased risk for infection.

Many specific diseases directly or indirectly cause immunosuppression. This includes many types of cancer, particularly those of the bone marrow and blood cells (leukemia, lymphoma, multiple myeloma), and certain chronic infections. Immunodeficiency is also the hallmark of acquired immunodeficiency syndrome (AIDS), caused by the human immunodeficiency virus (HIV). HIV directly infects a small number of T helper cells, and also impairs other immune system responses indirectly.

Various hormonal and metabolic disorders can also result in immune deficiency including anemia, hypothyroidism and hyperglycemia.

Smoking, alcoholism and drug abuse also depress immune response.

Heavy schedules of training and competition in athletes increases their risk of immune deficiencies.

Diagnosis

Patients with immune deficiencies can present with variable clinical phenotypes. This often translates into a significant delay in their diagnosis, and resultant patient morbidity. A structured approach on when to suspect an immunodeficiency and the initial investigations pathway is given in the publication by Grammatikos et al.

Immunodeficiency and autoimmunity 

There are a large number of immunodeficiency syndromes that present clinical and laboratory characteristics of autoimmunity. The decreased ability of the immune system to clear infections in these patients may be responsible for causing autoimmunity through perpetual immune system activation.
One example is common variable immunodeficiency (CVID) where multiple autoimmune diseases are seen, e.g., inflammatory bowel disease, autoimmune thrombocytopenia, and autoimmune thyroid disease.
Familial hemophagocytic lymphohistiocytosis, an autosomal recessive primary immunodeficiency, is another example. Low blood levels of red blood cells, white blood cells, and platelets, rashes, lymph node enlargement, and enlargement of the liver and spleen are commonly seen in these patients. Presence of multiple uncleared viral infections due to lack of perforin are thought to be responsible.
In addition to chronic and/or recurrent infections many autoimmune diseases including arthritis, autoimmune hemolytic anemia, scleroderma and type 1 diabetes are also seen in X-linked agammaglobulinemia (XLA).
Recurrent bacterial and fungal infections and chronic inflammation of the gut and lungs are seen in chronic granulomatous disease (CGD) as well. CGD is caused by a decreased production of nicotinamide adenine dinucleotide phosphate (NADPH) oxidase by neutrophils.
Hypomorphic RAG mutations are seen in patients with midline granulomatous disease; an autoimmune disorder that is commonly seen in patients with granulomatosis with polyangiitis and NK/T cell lymphomas.
Wiskott–Aldrich syndrome (WAS) patients also present with eczema, autoimmune manifestations, recurrent bacterial infections and lymphoma.
In autoimmune polyendocrinopathy-candidiasis-ectodermal dystrophy (APECED) also autoimmunity and infections coexist: organ-specific autoimmune manifestations (e.g., hypoparathyroidism and adrenocortical failure) and chronic mucocutaneous candidiasis.
Finally, IgA deficiency is also sometimes associated with the development of autoimmune and atopic phenomena.

Causes
The cause of immunodeficiency varies depending on the nature of the disorder. The cause can be either genetic or acquired by malnutrition and poor sanitary conditions. Only for some genetic causes, the exact genes are known.

Treatment
Available treatment falls into two modalities: treating infections and boosting the immune system.

Prevention of Pneumocystis pneumonia using trimethoprim/sulfamethoxazole is useful in those who are immunocompromised. In the early 1950s Immunoglobulin(Ig) was used by doctors to treat patients with primary immunodeficiency through intramuscular injection. Ig replacement therapy are infusions that can be either subcutaneous or intravenously administrated, resulting in higher Ig levels for about three to four weeks, although this varies with each patient.

Prognosis
Prognosis depends greatly on the nature and severity of the condition.  Some deficiencies cause early mortality (before age one), others with or even without treatment are lifelong conditions that cause little mortality or morbidity.  Newer stem cell transplant technologies may lead to gene based treatments of
debilitating and fatal genetic immune deficiencies.  Prognosis of acquired immune deficiencies depends on avoiding or treating the causative agent or
condition (like AIDS).

See also 
 Acquired immune deficiency syndrome (AIDS)
 Immune disorder
 Autoimmune disease, immune response to self-proteins
 Allergy, immune response to harmless non-self proteins
 Histamine
 Immunosenescence, age-associated immune deficiency
 Steroids, commonly administered drugs like prednisone that suppress the immune system
 Human genetic enhancement
 Immune system
 Immunology

References

External links 

 Immune Deficiency Foundation
 The European Society of Immunodeficiencies